In music, Op. 144 stands for Opus number 144. Compositions that are assigned this number include:

 Reger – Der Einsiedler
 Schumann – "Neujahrslied" for chorus and orchestra
 Shostakovich – String Quartet No. 15